PTI may refer to:

Arts and entertainment
 Pardon the Interruption, an American television sports show
 PTI, a musical group on the WTII Records label

Organizations
 Pacific Torah Institute, a yeshiva high school in Vancouver, British Columbia, Canada
 Pakistan Tehreek-e-Insaf, a Pakistani political party
 Partai Tionghoa Indonesia (Chinese Indonesian Party), a political party in the Dutch East Indies
 Pennsylvania Transportation Institute, a research unit of Pennsylvania State University's College of Engineering
 Philippine Tobacco Institute, a Philippine trade association
 Piedmont Triad International Airport, an American airport
 Pittsburgh Technical Institute, an American two-year technical college
 Portugal Telecom International, a division of Portugal Telecom, a Portuguese telecommunications service provider
 Post-Tensioning Institute, an American non-profit trade organization
 Powertech Technology Inc., Taiwanese semiconductor assembler
 Premier Travel Inn, the former name of the British hotel chain Premier Inn
 Press Trust of India, an Indian news agency, headquartered in Delhi
 Public Technical Identifiers, the corporation responsible for maintaining the Internet's unique identifiers on behalf of ICANN as a successor to the Internet Assigned Numbers Authority

Science and technology
 Page-table isolation, a Linux kernel feature that mitigates the Meltdown security vulnerability
 Palomar Testbed Interferometer, a long-baseline interferometer at the American Palomar Observatory in San Diego County, California, US
 PAMP-triggered immunity, an immunity response to pathogen-associated molecular pattern (PAMPs) microbial epitopes in plants
 Proof Tracking Index, used to measure the electrical breakdown (tracking) properties of an insulating material
 Ti plasmid (pTi), a circular plasmid used in creation of transgenic plants

Other uses
 Parent-teacher interview, a short conference between students' parents and teachers
 Physical training instructor, an instructor in physical fitness
 Pretrial Intervention Program, a program for first-time offenders in New Jersey, US
 Produce Traceability Initiative, a program to track produce through the supply chain

See also
 PT1 (disambiguation)
 Part One